Phanera ornata is a species of lianas in the subfamily Cercidoideae and the tribe Bauhinieae, the genus having been separated from Bauhinia.  Under its synonym, Bauhinia ornata, its  Vietnamese name is "móng bò diện".   Distribution records exist from Assam, S. China and Indochina, where wild plants grow primarily in the tropical forest biome.<ref name = POWO>POWO: Phanera ornata (Kurz) Thoth.</ref>

Accepted infraspecific namesPlants of the World Online lists:
 P. ornata subsp. mizoramensis (Bandyop., B.D. Sharma & Thoth.) Bandyop., P.P. Ghoshal & M.K. Pathak -  Assam (Mizoram) only
 P. ornata subsp. ornata (Kurz) Thoth.

 P. ornata var. balansae (Gagnep.) Bandyop., P.P. Ghoshal & M.K. Pathak
 P. ornata var. burmanica (K. Larsen & S.S. Larsen) Bandyop., P.P. Ghoshal & M.K. Pathak
 P. ornata var. kerrii (Gagnep.) Bandyop., P.P. Ghoshal & M.K. Pathak (synonym P. o. var. subumbellata)
 P. ornata var. ornata'' (Kurz) Thoth.

References

External links
Images at iNaturalist

Cercidoideae
Flora of Indo-China
Fabales of Asia